Medicine 4 My Pain is the debut album by British R&B singer Lynden David Hall.  The album was first released in November 1997 on the Cooltempo label and reached No. 166 on the UK Albums Chart.  The album was a critical success, and was instrumental in Hall's winning of the 'Best Newcomer' award at the 1998 MOBO ceremony. The album was re-released on 2 November 1998 with new artwork and three bonus tracks.  Paying tribute after Hall's death in 2006, disc jockey Ronnie Herel described Medicine 4 My Pain as "a landmark album for UK black music."

The re-released version of Medicine 4 My Pain peaked at No. 43 on the UK Albums Chart, and produced three top 50 singles.

Track listing 
All tracks composed by Lynden David Hall.

 "Do I Qualify?" – 4:47  
 "Sexy Cinderella" – 4:40  
 "Crescent Moon" – 5:12  
 "There Goes My Sanity" – 5:16  
 "One Hundred Heart Attacks" – 4:43  
 "Livin' the Lie" – 5:11  
 "The Jimmy Lee Story" – 4:45  
 "Yellow in Blue" – 4:07  
 "I Wish I Knew" – 4:28  
 "Jennifer Smiles" – 4:20  
 "Medicine 4 My Pain" – 5:09  
 "Do Angels Cry?" – 4:09  
 "There Goes My Sanity" (Full Crew Mix) – 4:00  
 "Sexy Cinderella" (C&J Remix) – 4:00

Singles 
1997 - "Sexy Cinderella" (UK #45)
1997 - "Do I Qualify?" (UK #26)
1998 - "Crescent Moon" (UK #45)
1998 - "Sexy Cinderella (C&J Remix)" (UK #17)
1999 - "Medicine 4 My Pain"

References 

Lynden David Hall albums
1997 debut albums
Cooltempo Records albums